Nick Stajduhar (born December 6, 1974 in Kitchener, Ontario) is a former professional ice hockey defenceman.  He was selected by the Edmonton Oilers in the first round of the 1993 NHL Entry Draft, 16th overall, a pick the Oilers received from the Los Angeles Kings in the Wayne Gretzky trade.

Stajduhar only played two games for Edmonton, largely bouncing around the minor leagues, including three years in the East Coast Hockey League with the Pensacola Ice Pilots, as well as even lower level play with the Memphis Riverkings of the Central Hockey League and the Flint Generals of the United Hockey League.

Career 
Stajduhar was a physical, offense-minded defenceman during his junior years (with the OHL's London Knights), however his play went into a sharp decline following an off-season incident outside a nightclub in Edmonton during Stajduhar's spell with the Cape Breton Oilers.  Stajduhar was sucker-punched in the back of the head, an injury that left him concussed and delayed his start the following season.

Career statistics

Regular season and playoffs

International

External links 

1974 births
Living people
Canadian ice hockey defencemen
Cape Breton Oilers players
Edmonton Oilers draft picks
Edmonton Oilers players
Ice hockey people from Ontario
Sportspeople from Kitchener, Ontario
London Knights players
National Hockey League first-round draft picks